The Oklahoma Kid is a 1939 Western film starring James Cagney and Humphrey Bogart. The film was directed for Warner Bros. by Lloyd Bacon. Cagney plays an adventurous gunslinger in a broad-brimmed cowboy hat while Bogart portrays his black-clad and viciously villainous nemesis. The film is often remembered for Cagney's character rubbing the thumb and forefinger of his hand together and exulting, "Feel that air!"

The supporting cast features Rosemary Lane, Donald Crisp, and Ward Bond. Rosemary Lane's sister Priscilla Lane also starred with Cagney and Bogart in The Roaring Twenties that same year.

Plot
President Cleveland signs the bill allowing the sale of the Cherokee Strip (more often referred to as Cherokee Outlet) in the Oklahoma Territory. After the money arrives by train, it is then loaded onto a stagecoach which subsequently gets robbed by Whip McCord and his gang. Jim Kincaid, also known as "The Oklahoma Kid", witnesses the robbery, then ambushes the gang and makes off with the money.

Settlers are arriving to stake their property claims in what would be the Cherokee Strip Land Run of 1893. At a settlers' dance, the Kid meets Jane Hardwick, daughter of Judge Hardwick, dances with her, and  asks if she can "feel the air". Before the new territory is opened, McCord sneaks in with his cronies and stakes a "sooner" claim. When John Kincaid and his son, Ned Kincaid, arrive, McCord uses his illegal claim to blackmail them into granting him the saloon and gambling concessions in exchange for the site that they had planned to develop into a town. The area is built and developed, and becomes the city of Tulsa (which in historical reality is not located within the former Cherokee Outlet and was not settled by land run). Soon it is overcome by crime and unlawful killings under McCord's influence. Hoping to bring about law and order, Judge Hardwick and Ned campaign to elect John Kincaid as mayor, but when another candidate is killed, McCord frames John Kincaid and has him arrested for murder.

While living with Mexicans in a small cabin, the Kid reads in a newspaper about the arrest of his father. Even though he was cast aside as the black-sheep son because of his penchant for vigilantism, he rides into town in order to free his father from jail. After the Kid raids the jail and enters his father's cell, John remains true to his belief in law and order. He refuses to escape and instead wants to fight his arrest judicially. The Kid leaves before being caught. Upon learning that the Kid is John Kincaid's son, McCord incites a mob at his saloon. Then, led by three of his own men, they break into the jail and lynch Kincaid over the outside balcony of the jailhouse.

In exacting vengeance, the Kid tracks down those  who murdered his father. Worried for his safety, Jane tries to dissuade The Kid, telling him that she loves him. He suggests she would be better off with the more respectable and upstanding Ned and carries on with his mission. He kills three of the gang when they don't surrender peacefully, but brings back Ace Doolin to testify against McCord. Ned and the Kid seek out McCord at his saloon. While attempting an arrest, Ned is shot by McCord. The Kid and McCord engage in a fist fight, and the Kid is nearly killed, but Ned shoots down McCord before dying himself.

Jane asks the Kid to stay, but he declares his intention to leave his unhappy memories of Oklahoma behind and head for the Arizona Territory. Jane notes that if he plans to do any "empire-building" he won't be able to do it by himself. Judge Hardwick arrives and, despite The Kid's mild and short-lived protests, Jane has her father quickly marry the two.

Cast

Credited Cast
James Cagney as Jim Kincaid / "The Oklahoma Kid"
Humphrey Bogart as Whip McCord 
Rosemary Lane as Jane Hardwick 
Donald Crisp as Judge Hardwick 
Harvey Stephens as Ned Kincaid 
Hugh Sothern as John Kincaid 
Charles Middleton as Alec Martin 
Edward Pawley as Ace Doolin 
Ward Bond as Wes Handley 
Lew Harvey as Ed Curley 
Trevor Bardette as Indian Jack Pasco 
John Miljan as Ringo (the lawyer)
Arthur Aylesworth as Judge Morgan
Irving Bacon as Hotel Clerk
Joe Devlin as Keely
Wade Boteler as Sheriff Abe Collins

Uncredited cast
Whizzer as Kincaid's Horse
Ray Mayer as Professor
Dan Wolheim as Deputy
Bob Kortman as Juryman
Tex Cooper as Old Man in Bar
John Harron as Secretary
Stuart Holmes as President Grover Cleveland
Jeffrey Sayre as Times Reporter
Frank Mayo as Land Agent
Jack Mower as Mail Clerk
Al Bridge as Settler
Don Barclay as Drunk
Horace Murphy, Robert Homans, and George Lloyd as Bartenders
Rosina Galli as Manuelita
George Regas as Pedro
Clem Bevans as Postman
Soledad Jimenez as Indian Woman
Ed Brady as Foreman
Tom Chatterton as Homesteader
Elliott Sullivan as Henchman
Spencer Charters
Robert Homans as Bartender

References

External links
 
 The Oklahoma Kid at RottenTomatoes
 
 
 

1939 films
American black-and-white films
Films scored by Max Steiner
Films directed by Lloyd Bacon
1939 Western (genre) films
Warner Bros. films
American Western (genre) films
Films produced by Hal B. Wallis
1930s English-language films
1930s American films